The 1930 All-Pro Team consisted of American football players chosen by various selectors for the All-Pro team of the National Football League (NFL) for the 1930 NFL season. Teams were selected by, among others, the Green Bay Press-Gazette (GB), based on the returns of ballots sent to the league's coaches, club officials, sports writers and officials, and Collyer's Eye (CE).

Team

References

All-Pro Teams
1930 National Football League season